Magicicada septendecula is a species of insect in family Cicadidae. It is endemic to the United States.

Life cycle
Their median life cycle from egg to natural adult death is around seventeen years. However, their life cycle can range between thirteen and twenty-one years.

References

Insects of the United States
Insects described in 1962
Taxonomy articles created by Polbot
Lamotialnini